Dearing is a city in Montgomery County, Kansas, United States.  As of the 2020 census, the population of the city was 382.

History
The first post office in Dearing was established in January 1888.  Dearing was incorporated in 1909.

On March 25, 1925, The city was affected by the Tri-State tornado, damages included destroyed homes and a gas station

Geography
Dearing is located at  (37.058083, -95.709824).

Demographics

2010 census
As of the census of 2010, there were 431 people, 187 households, and 124 families residing in the city. The racial makeup of the city was 85.8% White, 0.2% African American, 5.8% Native American, 0.2% from other races, and 7.9% from two or more races. Hispanic or Latino of any race were 3.7% of the population.

There were 187 households, of which 25.1% had children under the age of 18 living with them, 51.3% were married couples living together, 9.6% had a female householder with no husband present, 5.3% had a male householder with no wife present, and 33.7% were non-families. 31.0% of all households were made up of individuals, and 14.5% had someone living alone who was 65 years of age or older. The average household size was 2.30 and the average family size was 2.79.

The median age in the city was 43.2 years. 20.9% of residents were under the age of 18; 6.6% were between the ages of 18 and 24; 24.8% were from 25 to 44; 31.1% were from 45 to 64; and 16.5% were 65 years of age or older. The gender makeup of the city was 50.1% male and 49.9% female.

2000 census
As of the census of 2000, there were 415 people, 175 households, and 123 families residing in the city. The racial makeup of the city was 92.53% White, 0.48% African American, 3.86% Native American, 0.24% Asian, 0.24% from other races, and 2.65% from two or more races. Hispanic or Latino of any race were 0.96% of the population.

There were 175 households, out of which 28.0% had children under the age of 18 living with them, 59.4% were married couples living together, 8.6% had a female householder with no husband present, and 29.7% were non-families. 25.1% of all households were made up of individuals, and 8.0% had someone living alone who was 65 years of age or older. The average household size was 2.37 and the average family size was 2.85.

In the city, the population was spread out, with 23.4% under the age of 18, 11.3% from 18 to 24, 28.0% from 25 to 44, 22.7% from 45 to 64, and 14.7% who were 65 years of age or older. The median age was 37 years. For every 100 females, there were 109.6 males. For every 100 females age 18 and over, there were 101.3 males.

The median income for a household in the city was $27,361, and the median income for a family was $30,417. Males had a median income of $28,472 versus $20,139 for females. The per capita income for the city was $12,745. About 10.6% of families and 14.2% of the population were below the poverty line, including 13.9% of those under age 18 and 4.8% of those age 65 or over.

Education
The community is served by Coffeyville USD 445 public school district.

References

Further reading

External links
 City of Dearing
 Dearing - Directory of Public Officials
 Dearing city map, KDOT

Cities in Kansas
Cities in Montgomery County, Kansas